Omer Mohamed Bakhit (born November 24, 1984 in Sudan) is a Sudanese football midfielder currently playing for Al-Hilal.  He is a member of the Sudan national football team. He also plays as a left back or a defensive midfielder. He is very good in short and long passes

Honours
With Al-Hilal Club
Sudan Premier League
Champion (9) 2003, 2004, 2005, 2006, 2007, 2009, 2010, 2012, 2014
Sudan Cup
Winner (4) 2002, 2004, 2009, 2011
With Al-Merrikh SC
Sudan Premier League
Champion  (1) 2015
Sudan Cup
Winner  (1) 2015
with Al-Ahly Shendi
Sudan Cup
Winner  (1) 2017
with Sudan National Football Team
CECAFA Cup
Champion  (1) 2006

Internationalgoals

References

External links
 

1984 births
Living people
Sudanese footballers
2008 Africa Cup of Nations players
Association football defenders
2011 African Nations Championship players
Al-Hilal Club (Omdurman) players
Sudan international footballers
Sudan A' international footballers